Bread & Amphetamines (Khlyab i amfeti) is the fourth solo studio album by Bulgarian rapper Big Sha. The album contains 19 tracks. It was released in January 2008.

Track listing

References

2008 albums
Big Sha albums
Bulgarian-language albums
Universal Music Group albums